The YJ-21 is a Chinese hypersonic anti-ship ballistic missile. The missile system is reportedly capable of engaging land targets and surface warships with a hypersonic, maneuverable, conventional warhead. The missile is possibly based on an export-oriented ballistic missile produced by China, named CM-401, but with more advanced features and capabilities. Publications of the PLA Navy suggested the YJ-21 is derived from DF-21D anti-ship ballistic missiles. The missile is claimed with a flight speed of Mach 6, and a terminal speed of Mach 10. The missile was revealed by Chinese Navy ahead of its 73rd anniversary, launching from a universal vertical launch system of the Type 055 destroyer. An export version called YJ-21E was showcased in Airshow China 2022.

Operators

People's Liberation Army Navy

See also
YJ-18
YJ-12
DF-21D

References 

Cruise missiles
Weapons of the People's Republic of China
Anti-ship cruise missiles of the People's Republic of China